The Military High School, located in Al Ain in the Emirate of Abu Dhabi, United Arab Emirates, is a military school operated by INTERED a subsidiary of the SABIS/ International School of Choueifat. It was opened in 2004 with the intention of educating local Emirati military cadets.

References

External links 
 Military High School website

Educational institutions established in 2004
Military education and training in the United Arab Emirates
Buildings and structures in Al Ain
Education in Al Ain
Schools in the Emirate of Abu Dhabi
2004 establishments in the United Arab Emirates